National Route 367 is a national highway of Japan connecting between Shimogyō-ku, Kyoto and Wakasa, Fukui in Japan, with total length has 68.5 km (42.56 mi).

References

367
Roads in Fukui Prefecture
Roads in Kyoto Prefecture
Roads in Shiga Prefecture